

Awards and Nominations

{| class="wikitable sortable plainrowheaders" 
|-
! scope="col" | Award
! scope="col" | Year
! scope="col" | Nominee(s)
! scope="col" | Category
! scope="col" | Result
! scope="col" class="unsortable"| 
|-
!scope="row" rowspan=2|AMFT Awards
| rowspan=2|2018
| Honey
| Best Dance/Electro Album
| 
| rowspan=2|
|-
| "Honey"
| Best Dance Recording
| 
|-
!scope="row"| ASCAP Pop Music Awards
| 1999
| "Show Me Love"
| Most Performed Song 
| 
| 
|-
!scope="row" rowspan=2|Antville Music Video Awards
| rowspan="2" | 2011
| rowspan="2" | "Call Your Girlfriend"
| Best Performance 
| 
| rowspan=2|
|-
| Best Choreography
| 
|-
!scope="row"|BDSCertified Spin Awards
| 2003
| "Show Me Love"
| 300,000 Spins 
| 
| 
|-
!scope="row"|Berlin Music Video Awards
| 2015
| "Do It Again"
| Best Narrative 
| 
| 
|-
!scope="row" rowspan=2|Billboard Music Video Awards
| rowspan=2|1997
| rowspan=2|"Do You Know (What It Takes)"
| Best New Artist Clip (Dance)
| 
| rowspan=2|
|-
| Dance Clip of the Year 
| 
|-
!scope="row"|Brit Awards
| 2011
| Herself
| International Female Solo Artist
| 
| 
|-
!scope=row|Classic Pop Reader Awards
| 2019
| "Honey"
| Single of the Year
| 
|
|-
!scope="row"|Danish Music Awards
| 2010
| Body Talk Pt. 1
| Foreign Album of the Year
|
| 
|-
!scope="row" rowspan=6|GAFFA-Prisen Awards
| rowspan=3|2010
| Herself
| Best International Female Artist
| 
| rowspan=2|
|-
| "Dancing on My Own"
| Best International Hit
| 
|-
| "Indestructible"
| Best International Video
| 
| 
|-
| rowspan=3|2019
| Honey
| Best International Album 
| 
| 
|-
| Herself
| Best International Artist
| 
|-
| "Missing U"
| Best International Hit
| 
|-
!scope="row" rowspan=6|GAFFA Awards (Sweden)
| 2010
| Herself
| Special Award
| 
| rowspan=6|
|-
| 2015
| Love is Free (with La Bagatelle Magique)
| Dance of the Year
| 
|-
| rowspan=4|2019
| Honey
| Album of the Year
| 
|-
| "Honey"
| Hit of the Year
| 
|-
| rowspan=2|Herself
| Solo Artist of the Year
| 
|-
| Electronic of the Year
| 
|-
!scope="row" rowspan=5|Grammy Awards
| 2009
| Robyn
| Best Dance/Electronica Album 
|
| rowspan=5|
|-
| 2011
| "Dancing on My Own"
| rowspan="2" | Best Dance Recording
|
|-
| rowspan="2" |2012
|"Call Your Girlfriend"
|
|-
|Body Talk Pt. 3
| rowspan="2" | Best Dance/Electronica Album
|
|-
| 2015
|Do It Again (with Röyksopp)
|
|-
!scope="row" rowspan=31|Grammis
| rowspan=2|1996
| rowspan="4" | Herself
| Newcomer of the Year 
| 
| rowspan=2|
|-
| rowspan="2" | Best Female Pop/Rock Artist
| 
|-
| rowspan=3|2000
|
| rowspan=3|
|-
| Artist of the Year
| 
|-
| My Truth
| rowspan=2|Album of the Year
| 
|-
| rowspan=4|2003
| Don't Stop the Music
| 
| rowspan=4|
|-
| "Keep This Fire Burning"
| Song of the Year
| 
|-
| rowspan=5|Herself 
| Artist of the Year
| 
|-
| Best Female Pop/Rock Artist 
|
|-
| rowspan="5"|2006
| Composer of the Year
|
| rowspan=5|
|-
| Female Pop Artist of the Year
|
|-
| Artist of the Year
|
|-
| "Be Mine!"
| Song of the Year
|
|-
| Robyn
| Album of the Year
|
|-
| 2009
| rowspan="6" | Herself
| Live Act of the Year
|
| 
|-
| rowspan="7"|2011
| Artist of the Year
|
| 
|-
| Female Artist of the Year
|
|-
| Composer of the Year
|
|-
| Innovator of the Year
|
|-
| International Success
|
|-
| Body Talk
| Album of the Year
|
|-
| "Dancing on My Own"
| Song of the Year
|
|-
| 2012
| "Call Your Girlfriend"
| rowspan=4|Music Video of the Year
| 
| 
|-
| 2014
| "U Should Know Better"
| 
| 
|-
| rowspan="2" |2015
| "Monument" (with Röyksopp)
|
| rowspan=2|
|-
| "Sayit" (with Röyksopp)
|
|-
| rowspan=5|2019
| Honey
| Album of the Year
| 
| rowspan=5|
|-
| "Missing U"
| Song of the Year
| 
|-
| rowspan=3|Herself
| Artist of the Year
| 
|-
| Composer of the Year
| 
|-
| Pop of the Year
| 
|-
!scope="row" rowspan=6|International Dance Music Awards
| style="text-align:left;"|1998
| Herself
| Best New Dance Solo Artist
|
| 
|-
| style="text-align:left;"|2008
| "With Every Heartbeat"
| Best Dance Music Video
|
| 
|-
| style="text-align:left;"|2011
| "Dancing on My Own"
| Best Commercial Dance Track
|
| 
|-
| style="text-align:left;" rowspan="3" |2015
| rowspan="2" | "Do It Again"
| Best Indie Dance Track
|
| rowspan=3|
|-
| Best Featured Vocalist Performance 
|
|-
| Herself (with Röyksopp)
| Best Artist (Group)
|
|-
!scope="row"|KTH Royal Institute of Technology
|2013
| Herself
| Great Prize
|
| 
|-
!scope="row" rowspan=4|MTV Europe Music Awards
| 1998
| rowspan=4|Herself
| MTV Select — Northern
| 
| 
|-
| 2010
| rowspan=3|Best Swedish Act
| 
|-
| 2011
| 
|-
| 2019
| 
| 
|-
!scope="row"|mtvU Woodie Awards
| 2011
| Herself
| Performance Woodie
|
| 
|-
!scope="row" rowspan=4|Musikförläggarnas Pris
| rowspan=3|2019
| rowspan=2|Herself
| Best Composer
| 
| rowspan=3|
|-
| Best International Success
| 
|-
| "Missing You"
| Best Song
| 
|-
| 2021
| Herself
| Honorary Award
| 
| 
|-
!scope="row"|NME Awards
| 2020
| Herself
| Songwriter of the Decade
| 
| 
|-
!scope="row" rowspan=2|Nordic Music Prize
| 2010
| Body Talk
| rowspan=2|Album of the Year
|
| 
|-
| 2019
| Honey
| 
| 
|-
!scope="row" rowspan=6|Nordic Music Video Awards
| rowspan=6|2015
| rowspan=3|"Monument"
| Best Artist Performance
| 
| rowspan=5|
|-
| Best Post Production
| 
|-
| rowspan=2|Årets Musikkvideo
| 
|-
| rowspan=3|"Monument" (The Inevitable End Version)
| 
|-
| Best Edit
| 
|-
| Best Director
| 
|-
!scope="row"|O Music Awards
| 2011
| "Dancing on My Own"
| Innovative Music Video
|
| 
|-
!scope="row" rowspan=7|P3 Guld Music Awards
| rowspan=4|2011
| rowspan=3|Herself
| Best Pop Artist
|
| rowspan=2|
|-
| Best Artist
|
|-
| Best Live Act 
|
|-
| "Dancing on My Own"
| Best Song
|
|-
| 2016
| rowspan=3|Herself 
| rowspan=2|Dance Artist of the Year 
| 
| 
|-
| rowspan=2|2019
| 
| rowspan=2|
|-
| Best Artist
|

Queerty Awards

!Ref.
|-
| 2019
| "Missing U"
| rowspan=2|Anthem
| 
|
|-
| 2020
| "Ever Again"
| 
|

Rober Awards Music Poll

|-
| rowspan=2|2009
| rowspan=2|"The Girl and the Robot" (with Röyksopp)
| Best Dance Anthem
| 
|-
| rowspan=2|Song of the Year 
| 
|-
| rowspan=4|2010
| "Dancing on My Own"
| 
|-
| rowspan=2|Herself
| Best Female Artist 
| 
|-
| Best Pop Artist 
| 
|-
| Body Talk Pt. 1
| rowspan=2|Best EP
| 
|-
| rowspan=2|2014
| Do It Again (with Röyksopp)
| 
|-
| "Tell Me (Today)"
| Best Cover Version
| 
|-
| rowspan=3|2018
| rowspan=2|Herself
| Best Female Artist 
| 
|-
| Best Pop Artist 
| 
|-
| "Honey"
| Floorfiller of the Year
|

Rockbjornen

The Rockbjörnen is a music award ceremony in Sweden, established in 1979 by the Aftonbladet, one of the largest newspapers in Nordic countries. Robyn has won a total of four awards.

|-
| style="text-align:left;"|
1995
| rowspan="4" | Herself
| rowspan="3" | Best Swedish Female Artist
|
|-
| 1999
|
|-
| rowspan="2" | 2010
|
|-
| Best Female Live Act
|

Scandipop Awards
The Scandipop Awards are an annual British online music award.

|-
| rowspan=2|2015
| "Do It Again"
| rowspan=2|Best Electropop
| 
|-
| "Monument" (The Inevitable End Version)
|

UK Music Video Awards

The UK Music Video Awards is an annual award ceremony founded in 2008 to recognise creativity, technical excellence and innovation in music videos and moving images for music.

|-
| style="text-align:left;"|2011
| "Call Your Girlfriend"
| rowspan="2" | Best Pop Video - International
|
|-
| style="text-align:left;"|2013
| "U Should Know Better" (ft. Snoop Dogg)
| 
|-
| style="text-align:left;"|2017
| "Hang Me Out to Dry" (ft. Metronomy)
| Best Alternative Video - UK 
|

Virgin Media Music Awards

The Virgin Media Music Awards is an online music awards group. Robyn  has received 1 nomination.

|-
| 2007
| "With Every Heartbeat"
| Best Track 
|

World Music Awards

The World Music Award is an international awards show founded in 1989 that annually honors recording artists based on worldwide sales figures provided by the International Federation of the Phonographic Industry (IFPI).

|-
| rowspan=2|2012
| rowspan=5|Herself
| World's Best Female Artist
|
|-
| rowspan=2|World's Best Entertainer Of The Year
|
|-
| rowspan=3|2014
| 
|-
| World's Best Female Artist
| 
|-
| World's Best Live Act
|

References

Robyn
Awards